Sawyerr is a surname. Notable people with the surname include:

Akilagpa Sawyerr (born 1939), Ghanaian academic
David Sawyerr (born 1961), Sierra Leonean sprinter
Harry Sawyerr (1926–2013), Ghanaian politician and quantity surveyor
Harry Sawyerr (theologian) (1909–1986), Sierra Leonean Anglican theologian and writer 
Queenstar Pokuah Sawyerr (born 1964), Ghanaian politician 
Yvonne Aki-Sawyerr (born 1968), Sierra Leonean politician